Antonio de Marco Soto (born January 7, 1986), best known as Antonio "Tony" DeMarco, is a Mexican professional boxer. He held the WBC lightweight title from 2011 to 2012, and has challenged once for the WBA (Regular) super lightweight title in 2014. DeMarco is a cousin of former world champion Humberto Soto.

Professional career

Lightweight
DeMarco claimed an interim belt after he dominated José Alfaro for 10 rounds before a stoppage was called. Demarco won every round before dropping Alfaro three times in the 10th round. Demarco's unbeaten streak is 15-0-1 with 10 knockouts, including 12 consecutive wins, since losing a six-round, majority decision to Anthony Vasquez in February 2006. He lined himself up to face the monster-punching full WBC titlist, Edwin Valero.

DeMarco's first chance at being world champion was unsuccessful after he was stopped by the late Edwin Valero of Venezuela to retain his WBC Lightweight belt. After absorbing 9 rounds of punishment, DeMarco's trainer advised the referee to stop the fight. DeMarco later stated, “I'm a Mexican fighter, I never wanted to quit but my trainer saw that Edwin was just a better fighter.” When the fight ended, Valero was eight points up on the scorecards of all three judges.

DeMarco rebounded with a second-round TKO victory over Daniel Attah. In his following fight, he defeated Reyes Sanchez by unanimous decision to win the WBC Silver Lightweight title.

WBC lightweight champion
On October 15, 2011, DeMarco stopped former two division champion Jorge Linares in the 11th round to claim the vacant WBC Lightweight title.

On September 8, 2012, Demarco stepped into the ring to make his second world title defense against John Molina, Jr. In round 1 DeMarco landed his straight left hand onto Molina's face and sent Molina back. As DeMarco had Molina hurt and up against the ropes, the referee jumped in and called a stop to the bout, only 44 seconds into the fight.

Light welterweight

DeMarco vs. Vargas
On November 22, 2014, Antonio DeMarco attempted to win his third world title in the junior welterweight division. DeMarco faced former olympian and current (Regular) WBA Junior Welterweight Champion Jesse Vargas. This fight took place at The Venetian Macao in Macau, SAR on the undercard of Manny Pacquiao vs. Chris Algieri on HBO PPV.

Professional boxing record

See also
List of WBC world champions
List of Mexican boxing world champions

References

External links

Living people
1986 births
Southpaw boxers
Boxers from Sinaloa
Sportspeople from Los Mochis
Mexican male boxers
Mexican people of Italian descent
World Boxing Council champions
World lightweight boxing champions
Light-welterweight boxers